Batman Sourcebook is a supplement about Batman published by Mayfair Games in 1986 and again in 1989 for the superhero role-playing game DC Heroes.

Publication history
Mayfair Games published the DC Heroes role-playing game in 1985, then published the 80-page supplement Batman the following year, written by Mike Stackpole, with cover art by Ed Hannigan.  In 1989, Mayfair Games published an updated 96-page softcover Batman Sourcebook, again written by Mike Stackpole, with additional material by J. Santana, Louis Prosperi, Jack Barker and Ray Winninger, graphic design by Gregory Scott, with cover and interior art by DC Comics staff.

Contents
This book contains 
 game statistics for a large number of people and places connected to Batman. 
 essays on Batman's relationship to Superman, his role in the Justice League, and his possible psychoses. 
 a sample adventure for the referee and a single player (playing Batman)
 maps of Wayne Manor, the Wayne Foundation and the multi-level Batcave

Reception
In the August–September 1986 edition of Adventurer (Issue #3), the reviewer thought the first edition of this supplement was "a reference work of great value to anybody wishing to play the part of Batman, or interested in his friends and foes." The reviewer concluded, "this is an excellent piece of research, well supported with illustrations and plenty of detail."  

In the January 1990 edition  of Games International (Issue 12), Mike Jarvis reviewed the second edition, and found the mixture of upper and lower case letters in section titles to be "messy". Although he enjoyed reading the descriptions of famous Batman foes — "a delight to read" — what drew his interest was the essays about Batman. Although he thought the included scenario was "nothing spectacular, it should prove entertaining enough." He concluded by giving this supplement an above-average rating of 4 out of 5, saying, "This is a high quality product [...] If all the supplements for the new edition of DC Heroes reach this standard then the future of superhero gaming looks rosy indeed." 

In the January 1991 edition of Dragon (Issue #165), Allen Varney was impressed with the second edition of the book, calling it a "polished update of one of the original edition's best supplements." Varney called the included adventure "snappy... But too bad the ending falls a bit flat." Although Varney did not like the book's  graphic design, saying "all the titles look like ransom notes!", he concluded that the book's contents were impressive and complete.

Reviews
Different Worlds #45 (March/April, 1987)
Games Review (Volume 2, Issue 5 - Feb 1990)
 Casus Belli #39 (Aug 1987)
Isaac Asimov's Science Fiction Magazine v10 n11 (1986 11)

References

External links
Review in Games International

Batman in other media
DC Heroes supplements
Role-playing game supplements introduced in 1986